Phil Baker may refer to:

 Phil Baker and Drew Vaupen, American television producer and writer
 Phil Baker (comedian) (1896–1963), American comedian
 Phil Baker (footballer) (born 1952), former Australian rules footballer
 Phil Baker (baseball) (1856–1940), American baseball player
 Phil Baker (rower) (born 1975), British rower

See also
 Philip Baker (disambiguation)